al-Jajiyah is a Syrian village located in the Subdistrict of the Hama District in the Hama Governorate. According to the Syria Central Bureau of Statistics (CBS), Jajiyah had a population of 6,419 in the 2004 census. Its residents are predominantly ethnic Syrian Turkmens.

References 

Populated places in Hama District
Turkmen communities in Syria